The Capt. John T. Burkett House is a historic house in rural Ouachita County, Arkansas.  It is located at 607 Ouachita County Road 65, near the community of Frenchport.  The -story wood-frame house was built c. 1899 by John Burkett, a ship's captain and part-owner of a local lumber mill. He later served as the chief warden at Cummins Prison, and then as a regional agent of the Internal Revenue Service.  The house is a fine example of Folk Victorian style.  Its front facade has a porch running across its whole width, mounted on piers made of locally manufactured bricks, with its hip-roof supported by concrete columns that resemble Tuscan-style columns.  The balustrade is a metal filigree work.  A gable-roof balcony projects above the center of the porch.

The house was listed on the National Register of Historic Places in 1998.

See also
National Register of Historic Places listings in Ouachita County, Arkansas

References

Houses on the National Register of Historic Places in Arkansas
Houses completed in 1899
Houses in Ouachita County, Arkansas
National Register of Historic Places in Ouachita County, Arkansas
1899 establishments in Arkansas
Folk Victorian architecture in the United States
Victorian architecture in Arkansas